(), also called  or  in China, are referred as  knots, Chinese frog closures and decorative toggles in English language, is a type of ornamental braiding closure made out of cord, consisting of a button (oftentimes a Chinese button knot for a traditional oriental style) and a loop; it is used to fasten garments without creating an overlap. Its purpose is to act as a fastener as well as providing a decorative closure for the garment. It is especially used on the cheongsam, where the  represents the cultural essence of the dress. This form of decorative fastener originated from China and was later introduced to other countries outside of China where they are now called frog closures, frogs, and frogging in English-speaking countries. It was first adopted in the military uniform of Western countries, where they gained popularity, before eventually making its way into civilian clothes of both genders, such as overcoats, spencers, and pelisses. Frog fasteners are usual to garments of Asian design, such as a shirt or coat with a mandarin collar, which features frog fasteners at the shoulder and down the front of the garment. In the design of a garment, frogging is the use of braided, frog fasteners is a detail of the overall design of the garment.

Terminology 
The English term frogging can be defined as an ornamental closures which are made of braid and cording.

China

Origins 

The  is actually the end-product of thousands years of traditional Chinese knotting craft, which is itself rooted in the  culture. As a form of fastener, the  first appeared on Traditional Chinese clothing, and can be traced back to the Song dynasty when fabric was braided into braid buckles to create the loop and the button knot.

Ming dynasty – Important period of development 

The braided buckles of the Song dynasty continued to be used in the Yuan dynasty. The  also became one of the favourite fashion accessory items of the Ming dynasty Chinese women. 

These interlocking buckles were not only functional as garments fasteners or as garment ornaments; they also expressed and symbolized the wishes and inspirations of its wearer, such as the longing of a better life; the wishes for a sweet and loving marital relationship through the theme of butterflies and flower; the wishes for a rich and wealthy life with the use of double silver ingots, and to express wishes for a long and healthy life with the theme of "Furong Flowers and ", which uses Furong flowers and the Chinese character 《》, as it is a homonym for the Chinese characters 《》which can literally be translated as "prosperity and longevity".

Usage in Chinese garment 

The  are now key elements in cheongsam representing its "soul" and provide a distinctive Chinese character to the dress; they are typically sewed at the centre of the mandarin collar and along the diagonal slanted (S-shaped) opening.

Design and construction 
The  is composed of a Chinese button knot is perceived as the male while its pair with the loop is considered as being the female.

The , which are used in the making of the cheongsam, are typically made out of silk or are made from the same materials as the dress. To create more elaborate shapes of buttons, a method called wiring is used to create the desired shape.

Types of  

The floral  can further be divided into other categories based on its shape:

Influences and derivatives

Military uniforms

Europe 
With the wide-reaching campaigns of Napoleon, the French military was often the first people to contact different cultures and styles. After having observing the use of frog closures in the East, they were adopted by the French Military

Frogs and frogging became an important decorative feature on military uniforms from the 17th–19th centuries. This was particularly evident for prestigious regiments, especially cavalry or hussars, and gave rise to the German term for frogging in general, 'Husarentressen'. These dolman jackets were tight-fitting and dominated by extensive frogging, often in luxurious materials such as gold, silver or brass metallic cording or brocades.

The frogging was usually far more than was necessary for fastening. In some cases it even became non-functional, with a concealed opening beneath it and the original jacket opening becoming a false detail. By the later 19th century, for lower grade uniforms down to postmen, telegraph boys and hotel pages, the frogging cordage would be retained as a decoration but there would be no corresponding toggle or opening with it.

United States 
In the United States, the frog fasteners were adopted during the War of 1812; however when the army regulations tried to promote a less European look, it was decided that the elaborate and complex frog fasteners would be replaced with more simple cotton cord loops.

Handmade Craftsmanship 
The  used in the Beijing-style cheongsam are typically handmade by skilled artisans; the process of their making is complex and can take up several days of work. It can typically take up to 26 procedures for the silk to be turned into eligible strips of fabric which can then be turned into the fastening. These procedures include brushing silk four times with a paste to harden it, as well as the cutting of the hardened silk into strips, the stitching of the silk strips before the wiring procedure with copper wire, and the ironing of the silk strips under high temperature as its final stage.

DIY frogs outside China 
Ready-made frogs are available in the market and can be purchased; however, the selection may be limited for the sewers. Thus, sewers may want to make their own and customized the end product in variety of styles.

Braid- or cord-filled bias tubing can also be purchased or be made to either match or contrast with the colour of the main garment. Frogs can be made out of self-fabric such that it is the same colour as the garment although frogs are usually chosen to be a contrasting colour to that of the garment.

Frogs can be made by looping and interlocking the cording or fabric tube into the desired design, then securing the places where the cords touch by hand-sewing. The frog is then stitched onto a garment, usually by hand. When a fabric tube is used, the fabric is cut on bias. This allows the fabric tube to remain smooth and flex easily when bent into curves.

See also
 Celtic knot
 Chinese knotting
Chinese button knot
Austrian knot

References

External links

Chinese traditional clothing
Textile closures